Horizons-2 is a  communications satellite owned by Horizons Satellite, a joint venture between SKY Perfect JSAT Group and Intelsat. Its orbital slot is located at 74° west longitude.

Launch 
Horizons-2 was launched from the Guiana Space Centre — along with the Rascom-QAF 1 spacecraft — aboard an Arianespace Ariane 5-GS. Launch occurred at 21:42 GMT on 21 December 2007.

Platform and payload 
Horizons-2 was built by Orbital Sciences Corporation based on its STAR-2 satellite platform, which will generate 3.5 kilowatts of payload power by means of two solar arrays, each equipped with three panels of UJT gallium arsenide cells. The solar arrays charge two lithium ion batteries with capacities of at least 3,850 watt-hours.

The spacecraft is 3-axis stabilized, with a zero momentum system. Hydrazine-fuelled monopropellant thrusters are used for stationkeeping, with an IHI BT-4 bipropellant engine used for insertion into geostationary orbit. It has a design life of 15 years, however it is fuelled for at least 16 years of operations. Its payload consists of 20 Ku-band transponders broadcasting through two  dual gridded shaped reflectors. It has 16 active transponders with 22-for-16 redundant 85 W TWTAs and four active transponders with 6-for-4 redundant 150 W TWTAs. The satellite will provide service to the continental United States, the Caribbean and parts of Canada.

References

Communications satellites in geostationary orbit
Spacecraft launched in 2007
Satellites using the GEOStar bus